Alfred Ernest Allen  (20 May 1912 – 9 March 1987) was a New Zealand politician of the National Party. In 1972, he was the seventeenth Speaker of the House of Representatives.

Biography

Allen was born in Onehunga, Auckland, in 1912, and baptised in the Onehunga Presbyterian parish on 28 July of that year. He attended a variety of primary schools in the Bay of Plenty, Franklin and Auckland. After attending Auckland Grammar School, he became a farmer; he would own farms in Port Albert on the Kaipara Harbour, Maramarua in the Waikato, and Clevedon in the Franklin District. He married Nancy Cutfield in 1935. They had one son and three daughters. In World War II he served in the 2nd New Zealand Expeditionary Force from 1940 to 1943; he was a sergeant major.

He unsuccessfully stood as the Hamilton candidate for breakaway Labour MP John A. Lee and his Democratic Labour Party in the 1943 general election. Of four candidates, he came a distant third with less than 6% of the votes.

He was the National Member of Parliament for Franklin from 1957 (when the veteran sitting MP Jack Massey was deselected by the National Party in favour of Allen) to 1972, when he retired. He was Chairman of Committees from 13 March 1970 until 7 June 1972, the first day of the third session of the 36th Parliament, when he was elected Speaker of the House of Representatives. He was appointed a Companion of the Order of St Michael and St George in the 1973 New Year Honours. He died on 9 March 1987 and was buried in the cemetery at St Brides Church in Mauku west of Pukekohe. His wife died in 1992.

Notes

References

|-

1912 births
1987 deaths
New Zealand Companions of the Order of St Michael and St George
New Zealand MPs for North Island electorates
New Zealand National Party MPs
New Zealand military personnel of World War II
Speakers of the New Zealand House of Representatives
Democratic Labour Party (New Zealand) politicians
Members of the New Zealand House of Representatives
Unsuccessful candidates in the 1943 New Zealand general election
Unsuccessful candidates in the 1954 New Zealand general election
People from Onehunga
People educated at Auckland Grammar School